Hound & Horn, originally subtitled "a Harvard Miscellany", was a literary quarterly founded by Harvard undergrads Lincoln Kirstein and Varian Fry in . At the time, the college's literary magazine The Harvard Advocate did not accept their work, so they convinced Kirstein's father, the president of Filene's Department Store in Boston, to fund the launch of their own literary magazine.  Modeled on T. S. Eliot's The Criterion, it was intended to focus on student life at the university and work submitted by its students and famous literary Harvard alumni. Later on in its run, the publication broadened in scope to include many modern writers. 

The title of the magazine was taken from Ezra Pound's poem "The White Stag": "'Tis the white stag Fame we're hunting, bid the world's hounds come to horn.”  Contributions were made by writers such as Gertrude Stein, Katherine Ann Porter and a young Elizabeth Bishop. In 1928, R.P. Blackmur became the magazine's first managing editor, staying until 1930 when he resigned. Yvor Winters served as a regional editor. Allen Tate was the Southern editor until 1933. In 1930, the magazine moved headquarters to New York City.  It ceased publication in  when Kirstein decided to fund George Balanchine and the newly established School of American Ballet.

It was the first to publish several writers who would later become famous, and to publish articles that would be historically significant, such as "The Reappearance of photography" by Walker Evans in 1931.

Years after the journal's demise, Ralph de Toledano approached Kirstein about reviving it. Despite initial interest in Kirstein, the project never came to fruition.

References

Quarterly magazines published in the United States
Student magazines published in the United States
Defunct literary magazines published in the United States
Harvard University
Magazines established in 1927
Magazines disestablished in 1934
Magazines published in Boston